Carl J. Richard is a professor of history at the University of Louisiana at Lafayette. He specializes in early American history and U.S. intellectual history. He has published several books over the years. He received a Ph.D. from Vanderbilt University in 1988.

Works
 The Founders and the Classics: Greece, Rome, and the American Enlightenment (Harvard University Press, 1994)
 Twelve Greeks and Romans Who Changed the World (Rowman and Littlefield Publishers, 2003)
 The Battle for the American Mind: A Brief History of a Nation's Thought (Rowman & Littlefield Publishers, 2004)
 Greeks and Romans Bearing Gifts: How the Ancients Inspired the Founding Fathers (Rowman & Littlefield Publishers, 2008)
 The Golden Age of the Classics in America (Harvard University Press, 2009)
 Why We're All Romans: The Roman Contribution to the Western World (Rowman & Littlefield Publishers, 2010)
 When the United States Invaded Russia (Rowman & Littlefield Publishers, 2013)
 The Founders and the Bible (Rowman & Littlefield Publishers, 2016)

References

External links
University of Louisiana faculty page

Vanderbilt University alumni
Living people
Year of birth missing (living people)
21st-century American historians
21st-century American male writers
University of Louisiana at Lafayette faculty
American male non-fiction writers